Raising Flagg is a 2006 film directed by Neal Miller and co-written by Miller, Nancy Miller and Dorothy Velasco.  It was shot entirely on location in Portland and St. Helens, Oregon.

Plot
Flagg Purdy (Alan Arkin) is a handyman who has been fighting a lifelong competition with Gus Falk (Austin Pendleton), his neighbor.  After losing a game of checkers and enduring other perceived slights, Flagg files a lawsuit against Falk, seeking to win control of a well and pumphouse on Falk's property through adverse possession.  The case goes to trial and although heavily favored to win, Falk loses on a technicality.  He responds by shunning Flagg and banning Flagg's wife Ada (Barbara Dana) from selling produce in his general store.  Other townspeople also side with Falk and boycott Flagg's services as a handyman.

Flagg responds by confining himself to his bed and announcing that he is terminally ill.  This causes a reunion of Flagg's large family, including radio personality Ann Marie (Glenne Headly), real estate agent Rachel (Lauren Holly), preacher Eldon (Matthew Arkin), worm farmer Travis (Daniel Quinn), and teenage Jenny (Stephanie Lemelin).  Extended family members also make an appearance seeking to claim Flagg's possessions.  Over the next several days, various issues and tensions between the family members, Flagg, and Falk are revealed.  Ultimately, many of the tensions are resolved, Flagg is "cured," leaves his bed, and reconciles with Falk.

Principal cast
 Alan Arkin as Flagg Purdy
 Lauren Holly as Rachel Purdy
 Glenne Headly as Anne Marie Purdy
 Barbara Dana as Ada Purdy
 Lyssa Browne as Tammy Purdy
 Austin Pendleton as Gus Falk
 Matthew Arkin as Eldon Purdy
 Robert Blanche as Matt Durwood
Jordan Fry as Porter Purdy

References

External links 
 
 
 Official Site

2006 films
Films set in Oregon
Films shot in Oregon
Films shot in Portland, Oregon
St. Helens, Oregon
American independent films
2006 directorial debut films
2000s English-language films
2000s American films